David Smallman (born 22 March 1953) is a Welsh former international footballer, who also played for Wrexham and Everton.

References

External links
David Smallman at Aussie Footballers

Welsh footballers
Wales international footballers
1953 births
Living people
People from Connah's Quay
Sportspeople from Flintshire
National Soccer League (Australia) players
Everton F.C. players
Colwyn Bay F.C. players
Wrexham A.F.C. players
Association football forwards
Bangor City F.C. players
Welsh football managers
Oswestry Town F.C. players